Men's Greco-Roman 130 kilograms competition at the 2016 Summer Olympics in Rio de Janeiro, Brazil took place on August 15 at the Carioca Arena 2 in Barra da Tijuca.

This Greco-Roman wrestling competition consists of a single-elimination tournament, with a repechage used to determine the winner of two bronze medals. The two finalists face off for gold and silver medals. Each wrestler who loses to one of the two finalists moves into the repechage, culminating in a pair of bronze medal matches featuring the semifinal losers each facing the remaining repechage opponent from their half of the bracket.

The medals for the competition were presented by Sergey Bubka, IOC member, Ukraine, and the gifts were presented by Ahmet Ayik, Vice President of UWW.

Schedule
All times are Brasília Standard Time (UTC−03:00)

Results
 Legend
 F — Won by fall

Final

Top half

Bottom half

Repechage

Final standing

References

External links
 NBC Olympics Coverage

Wrestling at the 2016 Summer Olympics
Men's events at the 2016 Summer Olympics